Orientkaj station is an above-ground Copenhagen Metro station acting as the terminus of line M4 in Copenhagen, Denmark. The station is in fare zone 1, and serves the Oceankaj Cruise Terminal and surrounding area. The station is next to a pier acting as the northern terminus for Route 991/992 of the Copenhagen Harbour Buses public ferry service.

Architecture

The station was built with a white colour scheme throughout, in keeping with the newly built development it serves which has been called Den Hvide By (translates to 'The White City').

History
The station was opened in March 2020.

Service

References

Railway stations opened in 2020
2020 establishments in Denmark
M4 (Copenhagen Metro) stations
Railway stations in Denmark opened in the 21st century